Qari Waheed Zafar Qasmi is a Pakistani Qari and na'at khawan, a performer of poetry in praise of the Prophet Muhammad. Qasmi recites in both in Urdu and Arabic languages.

Background
Qari Waheed Zafar Qasmi began reciting the Quran at the age of 7. Over the years, he has participated in several Qira'at competitions all around the world. In 1969, he won his first competition in Malaysia. In 1979, he won in another competition in Libya. Qasmi also won a competition on Tilawat-e-Quran-e-Majeed in Saudi Arabia and Syria in 1980 and 1981 respectively. In the 1970s, Qasmi joined Radio Pakistan. He was also known for his TV program Sar Chashma-e-Hidayat. Qasmi also effectively performed his role as a judge in Qira'at and Na'at competitions. He is best known for his Naʽat "Allah Hu Allah Hu" "Faaslon ko Takalluf Hai Hum Se Agar" "Zahe Muqaddar" and many others. His contribution in the field of Qira'at and Na'at led him to win the Pride of Performance award in 1984.

See also
 Qāriʾ
 List of Pakistani Naat Khawans

References

Living people
Pakistani Quran reciters
Pakistani performers of Islamic music
Islamic music
Recipients of the Pride of Performance
Pakistani radio personalities
Pakistani television personalities
Muhajir people
1952 births